Tourists is the fifth album by electronica band Psapp. It was released on Monday 2 September 2019 through The state51 Conspiracy.

Track listings

Personnel 
Psapp

 Carim Clasmann
 Galia Durant
Additional Personnel

 Shawn Lee - Drums, "uPVC"
 Gwen Cheeseman - Violin, "Vision"
 Anna Katharina Schumann, "Glove"

References

External links 

Psapp - Tourist CD (official)
Psapp Jumble Shop (official)
Psapp Official Website

2019 albums
Electronica albums by British artists